Roger Lowenstein (born 1954) is an American financial journalist and writer. He graduated from Cornell University and reported for The Wall Street Journal for more than a decade, including two years writing its Heard on the Street column, 1989 to 1991. Born in 1954, he is the son of Helen and Louis Lowenstein of Larchmont, New York. Lowenstein is married to Judith Slovin.

He is also a director of Sequoia Fund. In 2016, he joined the board of trustees of Lesley University. His father, the late Louis Lowenstein, was an attorney and Columbia University law professor who wrote books and articles critical of the American financial industry.

Roger Lowenstein's latest book, Ways and Means: Lincoln and His Cabinet and the Financing of the Civil War, was released on March 8, 2022.This book is the winner of the "Harold Holzer Lincoln Forum Book Prize.

Journalism
Lowenstein has published seven books, three of them New York Times bestsellers. In addition, he has written for many publications, including The Wall Street Journal, Smart Money, The New York Times, Fortune, the Atlantic Monthly, and others. He has also written a number of major articles and cover stories for The New York Times Magazine.

Books

References

External links
 rogerlowenstein.com
 Origins of the Crash — an audio interview
 Forbes.com — Q&A: Roger Lowenstein
 A conversation with Roger Lowenstein by Charlie Rose
 Interview on Financialsense.com

1954 births
Living people
American economics writers
American financial businesspeople
American finance and investment writers
American male journalists
Cornell University alumni
20th-century American non-fiction writers
21st-century American non-fiction writers
20th-century American male writers
21st-century American male writers